Therese Charlotte Luise of Saxony-Hildburghausen (8 July 1792 –  26 October 1854) was queen of Bavaria as the wife of King Ludwig I.

Biography

Therese was a daughter of Frederick, Duke of Saxe-Altenburg, and Duchess Charlotte Georgine of Mecklenburg-Strelitz, eldest daughter of Charles II, Grand Duke of Mecklenburg-Strelitz. In 1809, she was on the list of possible brides for Napoleon, but on 12 October 1810 married the Bavarian crown prince Ludwig. Their wedding was the occasion of the first ever Oktoberfest. 

She became queen in 1825. During the numerous love affairs of her husband, Therese suffered but tolerated the situation. She did not refrain, however, from demonstrating her disapproval in discreet ways; in 1831, she left town during one of his affairs, and she strictly rejected associating with the mistresses. Therese often assisted with the administration of the kingdom of Bavaria, especially when  Ludwig was absent from Munich during his numerous journeys, and she did have some political influence and participated in political issues. She was very popular and was considered to embody an ideal image of queen, wife and mother. She was involved in a great number of charitable organizations for widows, orphans and the poor. She was the object of great sympathy during her husband's infidelity with Lola Montez, which was one of many factors that contributed to his unpopularity and his abdication in 1848.

Children
Therese and Ludwig had nine children:
 Maximilian (1811–1864), who married Princess Marie of Prussia (1825–1889); King of Bavaria as Maximilian II from 1848 to 1864.
 Mathilde Caroline (1813–1862), who married Ludwig III, Grand Duke of Hesse and by Rhine (1806–1877).
 Otto (1815–1867), who married Duchess Amalie of Oldenburg (1818–1875); King of Greece as Otto I from 1832 to 1862.
 Theodelinde (1816–1817).
 Luitpold (1821–1912), who married Archduchess Auguste of Austria (1825–1864); Prince Regent of Bavaria (1886–1912).
 Adelgunde (1823–1914), who married Francis V, Duke of Modena (1819–1875).
 Hildegard (1825–1864), who married Archduke Albert of Austria (1817–1895) Duke of Teschen.
 Alexandra (1826–1875).
 Adalbert (1828–1875), who married Infanta Amalia of Spain (1834–1905).

Honours 
 : Sovereign of the Order of Saint Elizabeth

Ancestry

References 

1792 births
1854 deaths
Therese
Therese
Bavarian queens consort
Deaths from cholera
Therese
Therese
Queen mothers
Daughters of monarchs